Bijleveld may refer to:

Dutch persons 
 Ank Bijleveld-Schouten (born 1962), a politician
 Catrien Bijleveld (born 1958), a criminologist and professor
 François Pierre Bijleveld (1797–1878), a politician and mayor
 Joke Bijleveld (born 1940), a Dutch Olympic track-and-field athlete
 Pieter Claude Bijleveld (1828-1898), a politician and mayor

Dutch families 
 Bijleveld (Rhoon), a Dutch patrician- and regentenfamily from Rhoon
 Bijleveld (Westfalen), a Dutch patrician- and regentenfamily from  Westphalia